Jorge Alejandro Torres Bohórquez (born 26 July 1999) is a Peruvian footballer who plays as a left-back.

Career

Club career
Torres spent his whole youth career at Deportivo Municipal. In October 2017, Torres made his debut for the clubs reserve team.

In 2019, he was promoted to the first team squad and on 14 July 2019, 19-year old Torres got his official debut for Municipal in the Peruvian Primera División against FBC Melgar. Torres started on the bench, before replacing Aron Torres after 73 minutes. Torres made a total of five appearances in the 2019 season.

On 1 February 2021, he joined Segunda División club Comerciantes Unidos on loan for the rest of 2021. He was left without contract at the end of 2021.

References

External links
 

Living people
1999 births
Association football defenders
Peruvian footballers
Peruvian Primera División players
Peruvian Segunda División players
Deportivo Municipal footballers
Comerciantes Unidos footballers
Footballers from Lima